Transparency International Bangladesh (TIB) is the Bangladeshi branch of the Berlin-based Transparency International, a civil society organisation dedicated to fighting against corruption.

History 
TIB started its activities in 1997, under founding chairman Syed Humayun Kabir.

In 2016, it criticised new government rules on NGOs that received foreign funding. It also asked the government to not take a 2 billion dollar development loan from the world Bank. This law was created after TIB Executive Director Iftekharuzzaman called the country's  Parliament a 'puppet show stage'.

Major work areas 
 Research and Policy
 Civic Engagement
 Outreach and Communication
 Right to Information
 Citizen Charter
 Climate Finance Governance
 Water Integrity

Board of Trustees 
Board of Trustees, the highest policy making body of Transparency International Bangladesh, comprises:
 Perween Hasan - chairperson
 Ali Imam Majumder - secretary general
 Iftekharuzzaman - executive director
 Mahfuz Anam - treasurer
 Tawfique Nawaz - member
 Abul Momen - member
 Parveen Mahmud FCA - member
 Fakrul Alam - member
 Tasneem Arefa Siddiqui - member
 Susmita Chakma - member

References

External links 
 
 rtiforum.org.bd
 transparency.org

Economic development organizations
1996 establishments in Bangladesh
Non-profit organisations based in Bangladesh
Organisations based in Dhaka